Pristobaeus vanuaensis is a jumping spider species in the genus Pristobaeus. The female was first identified in 2008 by Barbara Maria Patoleta. The species was initially placed in the genus Palpelius but was renamed Pristobaeus vanuaensis when Palpelius was accepted as the junior synonym for Pristobaeus.

Description

Distribution
Pristobaeus vanuaensis is found in Fiji. The holotype was discovered on the island of Vanua Levu, after which the species is named.

References

Spiders of Fiji
Salticidae
Spiders described in 2008